Brook Highland (formerly known as Lake Purdy) is an unincorporated community and census-designated place in Shelby County, Alabama, United States. At the 2020 census, the population was 7,406.

Geography
Brook Highland is located at  (33.428571, -86.693028).

The community is located southeast of Birmingham along U.S. Route 280. Many shopping centers, restaurants, and neighborhoods are located in the community adjacent to U.S. 280. Downtown Birmingham is 13 mi (21 km) to the northwest, and Chelsea is 8 mi (13 km) southeast, both via U.S. 280.

Demographics

As of the census of 2000, there were 5,799 people, 2,789 households, and 1,327 families living in the community. The racial makeup of the community was 86.62% White, 7.78% Black or African American, 0.38% Native American, 4.14% Asian, 0.02% Pacific Islander, 0.47% from other races, and 0.60% from two or more races. 3.43% of the population were Hispanic or Latino of any race.

There were 2,789 households, out of which 24.5% had children under the age of 18 living with them, 40.9% were married couples living together, 4.7% had a female householder with no husband present, and 52.4% were non-families. 42.0% of all households were made up of individuals, and 1.2% had someone living alone who was 65 years of age or older. The average household size was 2.08 and the average family size was 2.98.

In the community, the population was spread out, with 21.3% under the age of 18, 14.4% from 18 to 24, 43.8% from 25 to 44, 17.3% from 45 to 64, and 3.1% who were 65 years of age or older. The median age was 29 years. For every 100 females, there were 104.1 males. For every 100 females age 18 and over, there were 105.6 males.

The median income for a household in the community was $54,349, and the median income for a family was $91,989. Males had a median income of $49,792 versus $32,188 for females. The per capita income for the community was $39,019. About 0.2% of families and 3.5% of the population were below the poverty line, including 1.1% of those under age 18 and 1.7% of those age 65 or over.

2010 census
As of the census of 2010, there were 6,746 people, 3,242 households, and 1,588 families living in the community. The racial makeup of the community was 73.6% White, 16.2% Black or African American, 0.2% Native American, 4.4% Asian, 0% Pacific Islander, 3.5% from other races, and 2.1% from two or more races. 7.8% of the population were Hispanic or Latino of any race.

There were 3,242 households, out of which 23.1% had children under the age of 18 living with them, 37.9% were married couples living together, 8.3% had a female householder with no husband present, and 51.0% were non-families. 42.2% of all households were made up of individuals, and 2.2% had someone living alone who was 65 years of age or older. The average household size was 2.08 and the average family size was 2.93.

In the community, the population was spread out, with 20.3% under the age of 18, 13.5% from 18 to 24, 35.2% from 25 to 44, 25.6% from 45 to 64, and 5.4% who were 65 years of age or older. The median age was 31.3 years. For every 100 females, there were 98.2 males. For every 100 females age 18 and over, there were 95.9 males.

The median income for a household in the community was $57,214, and the median income for a family was $116,498. Males had a median income of $57,413 versus $41,948 for females. The per capita income for the community was $40,578. About 2.4% of families and 4.7% of the population were below the poverty line, including 2.3% of those under age 18 and 0% of those age 65 or over.

References

Unincorporated communities in Alabama
Census-designated places in Shelby County, Alabama
Census-designated places in Alabama
Birmingham metropolitan area, Alabama
Unincorporated communities in Shelby County, Alabama